Lovers and Other Strangers is a 1970 American romantic comedy film directed by Cy Howard, adapted from the 1968 Broadway play of the same name by Renée Taylor and Joseph Bologna. The cast includes Richard S. Castellano, Gig Young, Cloris Leachman, Anne Jackson, Bea Arthur, Bonnie Bedelia, Michael Brandon, Harry Guardino, Anne Meara, Bob Dishy, Marian Hailey, Joseph Hindy, and, in her film debut, Diane Keaton. Sylvester Stallone was an extra in this movie.

The film was nominated for three Academy Awards (it won the Academy Award for Best Original Song), and was one of the top box-office performers of 1970. It established Richard S. Castellano as a star (receiving an Oscar nomination for his performance) and he and Diane Keaton were cast in The Godfather (1972). The Oscar-winning song, "For All We Know", was composed by Fred Karlin, with lyrics by Bread's Jimmy Griffin and Robb Royer. It was famously covered by The Carpenters.

Lovers and Other Strangers was originally distributed by Cinerama Releasing Corporation. The film was released on VHS in 1980 by Magnetic Video, but was soon deleted. The Magnetic Video release was a collector's item for many years, but the film was eventually re-released on VHS by CBS/Fox Video in the 1990s. It is now available on DVD from MGM Home Entertainment, and on Blu-ray by Kino-Lorimer.

Taylor and Bologna followed up with their second screenplay the following year, Made for Each Other in which they also starred.

Plot
Mike Vecchio and Susan Henderson are engaged to be married. Mike wants to call off the wedding, arguing that it would be hypocritical for them to get married when they have already been living together for one year and a half. Mike relents on calling off the wedding after learning that Susan went to her first Halloween party dressed as a bride.

Mike's brother Richie and his wife Joan have grown "incompatible" and are considering divorce. Mike's Italian Americans-Italian-American parents, Frank and Bea, are relentlessly trying to dissuade Richie and Joan from divorcing.

Cast
 Beatrice Arthur as Bea Vecchio
 Bonnie Bedelia as Susan Henderson
 Michael Brandon as Mike Vecchio
 Richard Castellano as Frank Vecchio
 Bob Dishy as Jerry 
 Harry Guardino as Johnny
 Marian Hailey as Brenda
 Joseph Hindy as Ritchie Vecchio
 Anne Jackson as Kathy
 Diane Keaton as Joan Vecchio
 Cloris Leachman as Bernice Henderson
 Anne Meara as Wilma
 Gig Young as Hal Henderson
 Anthony Holland as Donaldson
 Bob Kaliban as Hotel Clerk
 Amy Stiller as Flower Girl / Carol
 Charlotte Jones as Johnny's Mother
 Morton Marshall as Father Gregory
 Conrad Bain as Priest In Confessional (uncredited)
 Connie Mason as Wedding Guest (uncredited)
 Jerry Stiller as Jim (uncredited)
 Sylvester Stallone as Groomsman (uncredited)

Release

Home media

The vinyl LP soundtrack of the film was released by ABC Records in 1971, catalogue #ABCS 0C 15. It has not been released on compact disc. The film was released by MGM on DVD on July 6, 2004 in full-screen format. The film was released on Blu-ray by KL Studio Classics on March 19, 2019 in anamorphic format with an HD master from a 4K scan of the original camera negative, and includes an audio commentary by film historian Lee Gambin. The aspect ratio for the Blu-ray is 1.85.1 (i.e., the screen dimensions of the original film).

Reception

Box office
The film was popular at the box office, earning $7.7 million in gross rentals in North America. It recorded an overall profit of $790,000.

Critical response
The film received positive reviews.

Accolades

Footnotes

External links
 
 
 
 
 

1970 films
1970s romantic comedy-drama films
ABC Motion Pictures films
Adultery in films
American films based on plays
American independent films
American romantic comedy-drama films
1970s English-language films
Films about marriage
Films about weddings
Films scored by Fred Karlin
Films set in New York City
Films that won the Best Original Song Academy Award
Cinerama Releasing Corporation films
1970 independent films
1970s American films